This is a list of markup languages. This page directly lists markup languages that have not yet been assigned to more specific categories. However, many specific markup language are instead listed only under the narrower lists referenced below.

Business, economy, and finance

BNML (Business Narrative Markup Language) 
BPML (Business Process Modeling Language) 
FpML (Financial Product Markup Language)
XBRL (eXtensible Business Reporting Language)

Culture, media, and entertainment

BulletML
OBML (Opera Binary Markup Language)
SMIL (Synchronized Multimedia Integration Language)
 Fountain

Science, technology, engineering, and mathematics

CFML (ColdFusion Markup Language)
Emotion Markup Language
GolfML 
InkML
Meta Content Framework
Parameter Value Language
Serializations of RDF (Resource Description Framework) like RDF/XML and RDF/N3
SBML (Systems Biology Markup Language)
SML (Spacecraft Markup Language)
VoiceXML
VHML (Virtual Human Markup Language)
XBEL (XML Bookmark Exchange Language) 
XBL (eXtensible Bindings Language)
XMPP (Extensible Messaging and Presence Protocol)

Types with their own lists

List of document markup languages -- This term is often used synonymously with "markup language", presumably because document can refer to any written or recorded representation.
List of XML markup languages -- XML itself is properly a meta-language used to define other markup languages.
List of general purpose markup languages
List of content syndication markup languages
List of lightweight markup languages
List of user interface markup languages
List of vector graphics markup languages

Lists of computer languages